The 2014 Morocco Tennis Tour – Meknes was a professional tennis tournament played on clay courts. It was the seventh edition of the tournament which was part of the 2014 ATP Challenger Tour. It took place in Meknes, Morocco between 15 and 20 September 2014.

Singles main-draw entrants

Seeds

 1 Rankings are as of September 8, 2014.

Other entrants
The following players received wildcards into the singles main draw:
  Hicham Khaddari
  Yassine Idmbarek
  Lamine Ouahab
  Taha Tifnouti

The following players received entry from the qualifying draw:
  Pedro Cachín 
  Matwé Middelkoop
  Julien Obry 
  Sherif Sabry

Champions

Singles

 Kimmer Coppejans def.  Lucas Pouille, 4–6, 6–2, 6–2

Doubles

 Hans Podlipnik Castillo /  Stefano Travaglia def.  Gerard Granollers /  Jordi Samper Montaña, 6–2, 6–7(4–7), [10–7]

External links
Official Website
ITF Search
ATP official site

Morocco - Meknes
Morocco Tennis Tour – Meknes
Meknes
Morocco Tennis Tour - Meknes